Murgash is a peak in Bulgaria, in the Balkan Mountains mountain range.

The peak consists of Paleozoic sediment and has a dome-shaped structure with steep slopes. Out of the summit of the peak stream two rivers – Baltuiska reka and Eleshnica river. The peak is an object of both international and national tourism. The Murgash touristic hut is located southwest of the peak with an altitude of 1490 meters.

The Eleshnishki monastery is located near the west foot of the Murgash peak.

In 1953, on Murgash peak a meteorological station was built and is still active.

Views from the peak

East 
East from Murgash peak lies a long horizon, which allows tourists to enjoy a pleasant sunrise.

South East 
From the peak, when looking toward South East, the Rhodope Mountain range can be seen.

South 
Toward the South, Sofia, and Rila Mountain, along with Musala peak can be seen.

West 
To the West, when the weather is clear you can see Serbian land and mountains.

References 

Balkan mountains
Landforms of Sofia Province